This is a list of African-American newspapers that have been published in Alabama.  It includes both current and historical newspapers.  

The first such newspaper in Alabama was The Nationalist, published in Mobile from 1865 to 1869.  Many more followed it, with some 100 newspapers established in the 1890s alone as the reading population grew and became more urbanized. 

Alabama's first state organization of African-American newspapers was the Alabama Colored Press Association, which was founded by the editors of nine papers in 1887. However, the association ceased to function after two years, due to many of its key members having been driven out of the state by racist violence.  As the growth of the African-American press continued unabated, the Afro-American Press Association of Alabama was established in 1894.

Newspapers

See also 
List of African-American newspapers and media outlets
List of African-American newspapers in Florida
List of African-American newspapers in Georgia
List of African-American newspapers in Mississippi
List of African-American newspapers in Tennessee
List of newspapers in Alabama

Works cited

References 

Newspapers
Alabama
African-American
African-American newspapers